Studyono-Yablonovka is a rural locality (a selo) in Krasnopakharevskoye Rural Settlement, Gorodishchensky District, Volgograd Oblast, Russia. The population was 258 as of 2010. There are 4 streets.

Geography 
Studyono-Yablonovka is located in steppe, on the Tsaritsa River, 22 km southwest of Gorodishche (the district's administrative centre) by road. Tsaritsyn is the nearest rural locality.

References 

Rural localities in Gorodishchensky District, Volgograd Oblast
Tsaritsynsky Uyezd